Kentish was a southern dialect of Old English spoken in the Anglo-Saxon kingdom of Kent. It was one of four dialect-groups of Old English, the other three being Mercian, Northumbrian (known collectively as the Anglian dialects), and West Saxon.

The dialect was spoken in what are now the modern-day Counties of Kent, Surrey, southern Hampshire and the Isle of Wight by the Germanic settlers, identified by Bede as Jutes. Such a distinct difference in the Anglo-Saxon settlers of the entire Kingdom of Kent is viewed more sceptically by modern historians.

Although by far the most important surviving Kentish manuscripts are the law codes of the Kentish kings, contained in Textus Roffensis, they were early-twelfth-century copies of much earlier laws, and their spellings and forms of English were modernised and standardised in various ways.  This particularly affects the Laws of Hlothhere and Eadric.  However, some indications of the differences between late-seventh-century Kentish and West Saxon can be made by comparing two contemporaneous laws.  The law code of the West-Saxon king Ine was composed at some point between 688 and 694.  Clause 20 concerns potential thefts by outsiders (i.e. those not owing allegiance to the kings of Wessex).  This was adopted almost word for word by Ine's contemporary, the Kentish king Wihtræd:

With many words at this point, there is no difference between Kentish and what became the dominant West-Saxon form of English.  Other words indicate possible differences in pronunciation (or, at least, of transcribing), such as fremde/ fræmde or gonge/ gange.  However, there is little doubt that, even with minor differences in syntax and vocabulary, the two forms were mutually intelligible, at least by this relatively late date in the Anglo-Saxon settlement of southern England.

The principal evidence for Kentish are the Old Kentish Glosses. Henry Sweet included two Kentish charters and a Kentish psalm (from the Vespasian Psalter) in his Anglo-Saxon Reader; a charter of Oswulf (805-10) and a charter of Abba (835).

Further reading
 Ursula Kalbhen, Kentische Glossen und kentischer Dialekt im Altenglischen, mit einer kommentierten Edition der altenglischen Glossen in der Handschrift London, British Library, Cotton Vespasian D.vi, Münchener Universitätsschriften (Frankfurt/M.: Lang, 2003),  [containing a detailed description of the manuscript and its texts as well as an edition of the Kentish glosses, with commentary and a study of Kentish Old English].

References

External links
Dictionary

Languages attested from the 7th century
Medieval Kent
Language articles with unknown extinction date
Old English dialects

fr:Kentien